The PHLX Semiconductor Sector (SOX) is a Philadelphia Stock Exchange capitalization-weighted index composed of the 30 largest U.S. companies primarily involved in the design, distribution, manufacture, and sale of semiconductors. It was created in 1993 by the Philadelphia Stock Exchange.

The Index contains the following 30 companies as updated on January 20, 2023:

 Advanced Micro Devices, Inc., AMD
 Analog Devices, Inc., ADI
 Applied Materials, Inc., AMAT
 ASML Holding N.V., ASML
 Azenta, Inc., AZTA
 Broadcom Inc., AVGO
 Coherent Corp., COHR
 Entegris, Inc., ENTG
 GLOBALFOUNDRIES Inc., GFS
 Intel Corporation, INTC
 IPG Photonics Corporation, IPGP
 KLA Corporation, KLAC
 Lam Research Corporation, LRCX
 Lattice Semiconductor Corporation, LSCC
 Marvell Technology, Inc., MRVL
 Microchip Technology Incorporated, MCHP
 Micron Technology, Inc., MU
 Monolithic Power Systems, Inc., MPWR
 Novanta Inc., NOVT
 NVIDIA Corporation, NVDA
 NXP Semiconductors N.V., NXPI
 ON Semiconductor Corporation, ON
 Qorvo, Inc., QRVO
 QUALCOMM Incorporated, QCOM
 Skyworks Solutions, Inc., SWKS
 Synaptics Incorporated, SYNA
 Taiwan Semiconductor Manufacturing Company Limited, TSM
 Teradyne, Inc., TER
 Texas Instruments Incorporated, TXN
 Wolfspeed, Inc., WOLF

History
The index was set to an initial value of 200 on December 1, 1993 and was split two-for-one on July 24, 1995; options commenced trading on September 7, 1994.

Semiconductor companies of the United States

External links
 https://finance.yahoo.com/quote/%5ESOX/components/